The Serb-Catholic movement in Dubrovnik was a cultural and political movement of people from Dubrovnik who, while Catholic, declared themselves Serbs, while Dubrovnik was part of the Habsburg-ruled Kingdom of Dalmatia in the 19th and early 20th centuries. Initially spearheaded by intellectuals who espoused strong pro-Serbian sentiments, there were two prominent incarnations of the movement: an early pan-Slavic phase under Matija Ban and Medo Pucić that corresponded to the Illyrian movement, and a later, more Serbian nationalist group that was active between the 1880s and 1908, including a large number of Dubrovnik intellectuals at the time. The movement, whose adherents are known as Serb-Catholics or Catholic Serbs, largely disappeared with the creation of Yugoslavia.

Background
Before the 19th century, it is difficult to ascertain the precise number of residents in Dubrovnik who self-identified as Serbs. Prior to the twentieth century, Dubrovnik had never been ruled over by a Slavic nation, although it did have close trade and political ties with medieval Serbian states. In the early Middle Ages, Dubrovnik lay at a crossroads between the Balkan regions inhabited by Slavic tribes. Most sources from the later medieval and early modern period simply refer to Dubrovnik's Slavic inhabitants generically as "Slav" and their language as "Slavic." With the increased emphasis on ethnic distinction in the nineteenth century, there are increased references to "Serbs" and "Croats" as distinct peoples of Dubrovnik.

The Republic of Ragusa (abolished in 1808) had enforced a single state religion of Roman Catholicism. The Eparch of Dalmatia Josif Rajačić dispatched the first Orthodox priest to Dubrovnik, Đorđe Nikolajević, in 1833.
Orthodoxy was given equal status with Catholicism only in 1848, by which time there were hundreds of Orthodox immigrants from Herzegovina in the city who maintained their religious affiliation with the Serbian Orthodox Church.

Early 19th century

In the 19th century, the politics of Dubrovnik started to include the matter of the city's belonging - with the emergence of romantic nationalism like the Illyrian movement and the emergence of the Kingdom of Serbia, and a resistance to the inclusion of Dubrovnik into the Kingdom of Dalmatia. The city, while Catholic, had centuries of historical connections to its mostly Orthodox hinterland, which were emphasized both through the propaganda of contemporary Serbia as well as through the numerous contacts of the city's intelligentsia with Serbia and Montenegro.

The cultural and political movement of Serbs in Dubrovnik was started around this time, notably by Nikolajević's 1838 article in the newspaper Srbsko-Dalmatinski Magazin (published in Zadar by Božidar Petranović), where he claimed the entire Ragusan Slavonic literary corpus for Serbian literature.

In 1841, Medo Pucić, a writer from an old Catholic noble family, became acquainted with pan-Slavists Ján Kollár and Pavel Jozef Šafárik, and started to espouse a Serb national sentiment. Medo Pucić was the first person to publicly call himself a Serb, while at the same time believing that the Croatian name for the language he spoke was merely a synonym of the Serbian name, so he was effectively an adherent of slovinstvo, a pan-Slavic view of South Slavic nationalities.

Matija Ban, another Catholic from Dubrovnik, was influenced by pan-Slavists and romantic nationalists Michał Czajkowski and František Zach in Istanbul, so much that he moved to Belgrade in 1844 in an attempt to promote his idea that Serbian patriotism must extend beyond Serbian Orthodoxy and the borders of the Principality of Serbia. In Serbia, Ban's group of enthusiasts worked with Serbia's minister of the interior Ilija Garašanin, the author of Načertanije, to enter the upper reaches of Serbian political life. They were not, however, met with uniform acceptance - Jovan Sterija Popović and others, with support of the Church in Serbia, protested against their ideas and by extension against Vuk Karadžić's notion that Serbian language and nationality extended beyond Orthodoxy.

During the Revolutions of 1848 in the Habsburg areas (1848-1849), the Serbian government was involved on the side of the South Slavs in Serbian Vojvodina, and at the same time Matija Ban traveled to Croatian lands and advocated for pan-Slavic as well as pro-Serbian ideas, claiming the Kingdom of Dalmatia should be unified with the Kingdom of Croatia-Slavonia, but also describing the language of Dubrovnik as Serbian. By 1850, the revolution was over and Ban, particularly because he had acquired Serbian citizenship in 1844, became suspicious to the Austrian police in Dubrovnik, who started to monitor him. At that point, he was summoned to Belgrade where Garašanin suspended all of his operations and ordered him to permanently return to Belgrade. He hesitated, but was persuaded by Prince Aleksandar and others to comply. He did however leave his family in Dubrovnik and published two more issues of the journal Dubrovnik in Ljudevit Gaj's publishing house in Zagreb in 1851 and 1852.

Late 19th century

The political reality of Dubrovnik of the latter half of the 19th century was rather bleak, with the historical city being relegated to an insignificant periphery of the Austro-Hungarian Monarchy, and this had a significant impact on the local politics and the emergence of the Serb-Catholic movement.

Three decades after Ban and Pucić, in the 1880s a sizable group of Ragusan intellectuals independently developed a Serb-Catholic feeling, but at that point it was a political movement that was openly hostile to the Croats and whose leaders cooperated with the pro-Italian Autonomist Party (i.e. it was not pan-Slavic).

Following the 1878 Congress of Berlin, the Habsburg Empire occupied Bosnia and created the Austro-Hungarian Condominium of Bosnia and Herzegovina, which prompted a confrontation between the Serb and Croat national ideologies, and the new "Serb-Catholic" circle of Dubrovnik increasingly broke with the pan-Slavic tradition of its founders, Pucić and Ban. The same year, Serbia obtained independence.

In the preparation for the Imperial Council election of 1879, the Serb Party of Dalmatia severed ties with the People's Party, which marked a significant shift in Dalmatian politics at the time. Subsequently, in 1890, a coalition of the Autonomist Party and the Serb Party won the municipal election in Dubrovnik, where the Autonomists were considered to be "Serb-Catholics". In the elections of 1899, local Croats saw their big mistake and a coalition of the People's Croatian Party (from 1899 new name of the People's Party in Dalmatia) and the Party of Rights came into power. 

There was substantial local controversy over the unveiling of the Gundulić monument that was planned since 1880 but was ultimately delayed to 1893.

In 1904/1905, a cultural society "Croatian and Serbian People's Home" from Cavtat (south of Dubrovnik) promulgated pan-Slavic ideas.

In 1908 (Austrian annexation of Bosnia and Herzegovina) all Serbian unions, clubs and newspapers in the city were closed and forbidden by Austrian authorities, which led to massive emigration of Serbian-oriented high society from the city of Dubrovnik.

Matica Srpska of Dubrovnik was founded in 1909 by the last will of Serbian businessman Konstantin Vučković.

The movement gradually shut down because the process of general political alignment of Croats and Serbs that happened in the beginning of the 20th century had eliminated its reason for existence, as the creation of Yugoslavia accomplished an integration with Serbia.

Legacy

After World War I, in the Kingdom of Yugoslavia those Serbs who were left in Dubrovnik opted for the Yugoslav national unity, in contrast to Croats in the city who opted for the preserving of autonomous status of Croatia in Yugoslavia and unification of Dalmatia with Croatia-Slavonia.

In a personal correspondence with author and critic dr. Milan Šević in 1932, Marko Murat complained that Orthodox Serbs are not acknowledging the Catholic Serb community on the basis of their faith.

In 1939 Dubrovnik with its district became part of Banovina of Croatia which was established the same year. Those circumstances intensified emigration. During the Independent State of Croatia (1941-1945), the city completely reoriented itself to Croatian culture.

Historiography in Croatia and Serbia hasn't covered this phenomenon neutrally - a large amount of Serbian works about it have been subjective and nationalist, trying to excessively emphasize it, while Croatian works have conversely tended to downplay it.  stated that the Serb-Catholic movement had inconsistencies and shortcomings in the linguistic, cultural and ethnic proving of the Serbian identity of Dubrovnik.

Organisations 

 Zadruga Srpkinja Dubrovkinja - founded in 1887
 Srpska dubrovačka akademska omladina (Serb Academic Youth of Dubrovnik) - founded in 1900
 Srpska Zora - founded in 1901
 Gimnastičko-sokolsko društvo Dušan Silni - founded in 1907 and headed by Mato Gracić
 Matica srpska - founded in 1909, funded and found by Konstantin Vučković
 Pasarićeva štamparija
 Štamparija Mata Gracića
 Savez srpskih zemljoradničkih zadruga
 Srpska štedionica

Notable people

 Ivan Stojanović (1829–1900), Catholic clergyman.
 Medo Pucić (1821–1882), Ragusan nobleman.
 Matija Ban (1818–1903), writer.
 Melko Čingrija (1873-1949), politician.
 Valtazar Bogišić (1834–1908), jurist and sociologist.
 Lujo Vojnović (1864–1951), politician and writer.
 Konstantin Vojnović (1832–1903), politician.
 Antun Fabris (1864–1904), writer.
 Pero Budmani (1835–1914), writer.
 Luko Zore (1846–1906), philologist.
 Marko Car (1859–1953), writer.
 Stijepo Kobasica (1882–1944), writer.
 Marko Murat (1864–1944), painter.
 Milan Rešetar (1860–1942), linguist and historian.
 Nikša Gradi (1825–1894), writer.
 Vicko Adamović (1838–1919), pedagogue and historian.
 Petar Kolendić (1882–1969), writer and literary historian.

See also 
 Dubrovnik Prayer Book
 Serb People's Party (Dalmatia)
 Serbian Revival
 Serbs in Dubrovnik

References

Sources

Kingdom of Dalmatia
Dubrovnik
Pan-Slavism
Serbian Roman Catholics
History of the Serbs of Croatia
Political history of Croatia
Political history of Serbia
19th century in Croatia
19th century in Serbia
Political movements in the Austrian Empire